Niemierze  is a village in the administrative district of Gmina Siemyśl, within Kołobrzeg County, West Pomeranian Voivodeship, in north-western Poland.

The locale's designation derives from the Slavic given name Niemir.

References

Niemierze